12 is an album by The Notwist, released in 1995. It has been described as a transition album between the earlier, punk rock and metal sound of The Notwist and Nook and the later, electronica and plinkerpop Shrink and Neon Golden. It was re-released in 2003 following the success of Neon Golden.

Track listing
"Torture Day" – 6:10
"My Phrasebook" – 2:00
"Puzzle" – 3:44
"M" – 4:12
"Noah" – 5:30
"My Faults" – 3:14
"The String" – 4:30
"Instr." – 2:49
"12" – 6:55

References

1995 albums
The Notwist albums